Siddharth Chitnis (born 6 May 1987 in Bombay) is an Indian cricketer. He has played for Kings XI Punjab since 2011.

References

Indian cricketers
Punjab Kings cricketers
Mumbai Indians cricketers
Mumbai cricketers
West Zone cricketers
Rajasthan Royals cricketers
Cricketers from Mumbai
1987 births
Living people